The European Team Championship bridge championship is held every two years. It is organised by the European Bridge League (EBL).

Open

Senior

Ladies

Ladies Pairs

References

Contract bridge competitions